Antonio Criscimanni (born 10 November 1957) is a retired Italian football defender.

References

1957 births
Living people
Italian footballers
Serie A players
A.S. Roma players
S.S.D. Varese Calcio players
Genoa C.F.C. players
S.P.A.L. players
U.S. Avellino 1912 players
S.S.C. Napoli players
Pisa S.C. players
Udinese Calcio players
Association football defenders